This is a list of products made by Fender Musical Instruments Corporation which have their own Wikipedia articles.

Guitars

Acoustic guitars
 Fender King, later named the Fender Kingman
 Fender Wildwood (1966–1971)

Electric guitars
Electric Guitars models in current mainstream production:
Fender Duo-Sonic
Fender Jaguar
Fender Jazzmaster
Fender Lead
Fender Mustang
Fender Stratocaster
Fender Telecaster

Signature Model Guitars
 Fender Eric Clapton Stratocaster

Discontinued Electric Guitars
Electric guitar models no longer in mainstream production:

Fender Bronco
Fender Bullet (a Squier model is available)
Fender Coronado
Fender Cyclone (a Squier model is available)
Fender Electric XII
Fender Esquire
Fender HM Strat USA/Japan
Fender Jag-Stang
Fender Katana
Fender Marauder
Fender Musicmaster
Fender Performer
Fender Prodigy
Fender Showmaster
Fender Starcaster (a Squier model is available)
Fender Swinger
Fender TC 90
Fender Toronado (a Squier model is available)

Electric Guitar Series (Discontinued)

Lead Series (reissued as Player Series since 2020)

Steel Guitars

Lap and Console Steel Guitars 

 Fender White Steel

Pedal Steel Guitars 

 Fender 1000 double neck 8-string pedal steel

Basses

Electric basses
Electric basses in mainstream production:

Fender Jaguar Bass
Fender Jazz Bass
Fender Mustang Bass
Fender Precision Bass

Discontinued basses
Electric basses no longer in mainstream production:

Fender Bass V
Fender Bass VI (now reissued as Squier Classic Vibe Series)
Fender Bullet Bass
Fender Coronado Bass
Fender Musicmaster Bass
Fender Performer Bass
Fender Prophecy II Bass
Fender Starcaster Bass
Fender Telecaster Bass (replaced as Squier Vintage Modified Precision Bass TB then Classic Vibe '50s Precision Bass)
Fender Zone Bass

Amplifiers

Tube amplifiers

 Bandmaster
Bandmaster Reverb
Bassman
Bantam Bass
Blues Junior
Bronco
Champ
Concert

Deluxe
Deluxe Reverb
Harvard
Hot Rod Deluxe
Hot Rod DeVille
Princeton
Princeton Reverb
Pro
Pro Reverb
Prosonic
Showman

Super
Super Reverb
Tremolux
Twin
Vibrasonic
Vibrosonic Reverb
Vibroverb
White

Solid State Amps

Second Series Solid State
 Harvard
 Showman

Third Series Solid State
 Bullet
 G-DEC

Speaker cabinets
Fender Vibratone

Software
 Fender Play

References

Bibliography
 

Fender Musical Instruments Corporation